Karl S. Bernhardt (1901-1967) was a Canadian psychologist and early researcher in child psychology.

Career
Karl S. Bernhardt was born in 1901. He was initially educated at Orillia Collegiate in Orillia, Ontario. He then enrolled at the University of Toronto from which he graduated with a B.A. in 1926 followed an M.A. in 1929. He proceeded to the University of Chicago from which he obtained a Ph.D. in 1933.

He joined the faculty of the University of Toronto where he became Professor of Psychology (1943-1964). He was also assistant director (1936-1960) and then director of the Institute of Child Study (1960-1964) at the university. He retired in 1964 and was named professor emeritus and director emeritus.

His papers are held in the University of Toronto archive.

Each year, the Department of Psychology at Carleton University awards the Karl S. Bernhardt Scholarship to the best student entering the Fourth year of the Honours Psychology program.

Positions
 President, Canadian Psychological Association (1947)

Publications
 Bernhardt, K.S. (1934). An Introduction to Psychology 
 Bernhardt, K.S. (1937). An Analysis of the Social Contacts of Preschool Children with the Aid of Motion Pictures 
 Bernhardt, K.S. (1942). Basic Principles of Pre-school Education 
 Bernhardt, K.S. (1943). Elementary Psychology
 Bernhardt, K.S. (1956). Making the Most of Your College Career; Helpful Suggestions for College Students 
 Bernhardt, K.S. (1961). Training for Research in Psychology
 Bernhardt, K.S. (1970). Being a Parent; Unchanging Values in a Changing World

References

Canadian psychologists
Child psychologists
20th-century Canadian psychologists
Academic staff of the University of Toronto
1901 births
1967 deaths
Presidents of the Canadian Psychological Association